Today Is the Highway is the debut album of folk singer Eric Andersen, released in 1965 on Vanguard Records. Andersen's first wife Deborah Green Andersen, accompanied him on second guitar for two tracks, "Today Is the Highway" and "Bumblebee".

Track listing
All songs by Eric Andersen unless otherwise noted.
 "Today Is the Highway" – 2:22
 "Dusty Box Car Wall" – 2:22
 "Time for My Returning" – 3:19
 "Plains of Nebrasky-O" – 3:29
 "Looking Glass" – 5:05
 "Never Coming Home" – 3:09
 "Come to My Bedside" – 3:56
 "Baby, Please Don't Go" (Big Joe Williams) – 3:22
 "Everything Ain't Been Said" – 4:39
 "Bay of Mexico" – 3:09
 "Song to J.C.B." – 4:55
 "Bumblebee" – 3:20

Personnel

Musicians
 Eric Andersen – lead vocals, guitar, harmonica
 Debbie Green – guitar, (tracks 1, 12)

Technical
 Richard Knapp – photography
 Jules Halfant – design
 Stacey Williams – liner notes

References

Eric Andersen albums
1965 debut albums
Vanguard Records albums